"Dizzy with Success: Concerning Questions of the Collective-Farm Movement" is an article by Joseph Stalin that was published in Pravda on March 2, 1930. In the article, Stalin claimed that agricultural collectivization had been carried out with excessive zeal, leading to "excesses" that had to be corrected.

References 

Works originally published in Pravda
Magazine articles
1930 in the Soviet Union
Propaganda in the Soviet Union
Soviet phraseology
Political catchphrases
Works by Joseph Stalin
1930 documents